Ivanovca may refer to several places in Moldova:

Ivanovca, a commune in Hînceşti district
 Ivanovca, a village in Iserlia Commune, Basarabeasca district
 Ivanovca, a village in Natalievca Commune, Făleşti district
 Ivanovca, a village in Sevirova Commune, Florești District
 Ivanovca, a village in Crasnencoe Commune, Transnistria
 Ivanovca Nouă, a commune in Cimişlia district